Omoo-Omoo the Shark God is a 1949 American exploitation film directed by Leon Leonard. Loosely based on the Herman Melville novel Omoo, it is about the curses that befall a ship following the removal of pearls from an island shrine.

The film is also known as The Shark God in the United Kingdom.

Plot
A sea captain has violated the tabu of a South Sea Island by removing some pearls that are the eyes of an idol of the Shark God. The captain is killed by two crew members who want the pearls.

Cast
 Ron Randell as Jeff Garland
 Devera Burton as Julie Guy
 Trevor Bardette as Capt. Roger Guy
 Pedro de Cordoba as Chief Tari
 Richard Benedict as Mate Richards
 Michael Whalen as "Chips"
 Rudy Robles as Tembo
 George Meeker as Dr. Godfrey Long
 Lisa Kincaid as Tala

Reception
Variety called it "an unpretentious jungle picture" in which the action sequences "seldom achieve an aura of realism" and "performances are generally listless with Randell turning in the most credible job."

References

External links 

 New York Times review
Omoo Omoo the Shark God at TCMDB
Omoo Omoo the Shark God at BFI

1949 films
1949 drama films
American drama films
American independent films
American black-and-white films
1940s exploitation films
Films based on American novels
Films based on works by Herman Melville
Films scored by Albert Glasser
Films set in Oceania
1940s independent films
Films set on islands
1940s English-language films
1940s American films